100 (Yeomanry) Regiment Royal Artillery was part of the Territorial Army and had sub-units throughout the South of England. It had three gun batteries all equipped with the L118 Light Gun. The regiment's original role was British Army of the Rhine (BAOR) emergency reinforcement, emphasised by its transfer into 49 Infantry Brigade under part of 2 Division. Under 'Options for Change', the regiment became a general support unit fitted out with the FH-70 155mm towed howitzer and assigned to 3 Division; in 1999, it was reassigned as a CS (Close Support) Regiment, losing its ability to deploy as a whole unit. Under Army 2020, it was placed in suspended animation.

History
The regiment was formed as 100th (Eastern) Medium Regiment Royal Artillery at Grove Park in London in 1967. Its sub-units were RHQ, HQ (Home Counties) Battery at Grove Park, Lewisham, (formed from Regimental HQ of 265th (8th London) Light Anti-Aircraft Regiment, Royal Artillery, together with HQ Royal Artillery of 44th (Home Counties) Division/District), 200 (Sussex Yeomanry) Medium Battery at Brighton, 201 (Hertfordshire and Bedfordshire Yeomanry) Medium Battery at Luton, 202 (Suffolk and Norfolk Yeomanry) Medium Battery at Bury St Edmunds and REME LAD which expanded into a workshop during the FH70 period. In 1970 it became 100th Regiment Royal Artillery and in 1976 it became 100 (Yeomanry) Field Regiment Royal Artillery. In 1993 200 Battery left the regiment and 307 (South Nottinghamshire Hussars) Battery at Bulwell joined the unit. It was renamed 100 (Yeomanry) Regiment Royal Artillery in 1993 and in 1999, HQ and 202 Batteries left the regiment; 202 was replaced by 266 (Gloucestershire Volunteer Artillery) Battery at Bristol.

Under Army 2020, this unit was placed in suspended animation and one of its batteries was transferred to another regiment.

Batteries
The batteries were as follows:
201 (Hertfordshire and Bedfordshire Yeomanry), based in Luton, placed in suspended animation under original Army 2020 reforms.
266 (Gloucestershire Volunteer Artillery), based in Bristol, used the 105mm Light Gun in support of 29th Commando Regiment Royal Artillery. Under Army 2020, this battery was subordinated to the 104th Regiment Royal Artillery, and re-roled to mini unmanned air systems.
307 (South Nottinghamshire Hussars) Battery, based in Bulwell, placed in suspended animation under original Army 2020 reforms.

Honorary colonels
 King Carl XVI Gustaf of Sweden until 2001 (Moved to 106 Regiment)
 Major General Freddie Viggers, ? to 17 February 2001 
 Major General Andrew Ritchie, 17 February 2001 to disbandment

References

Royal Artillery regiments
Yeomanry regiments of the British Army